The Will was an American reality television series on CBS that lasted only one episode, shown on Saturday, January 8, 2005. It centered on the "Benefactor", a multi-millionaire from Arizona named Bill Long. Ten of his friends and relatives competed in a series of challenges to win the right to inherit his "prized possession", a huge Kansas ranch.

The show was created by Mike Fleiss, who produced The Bachelor for ABC. The Will is one of only a handful of series in American history to be pulled after one episode.
In the case of The Will, cancellation was due to very low ratings. Despite receiving a heavy promotional push from CBS, the program averaged only 4.2 million viewers during its 8:00-9:30PM ET/PT time slot, which made it CBS's lowest-ranked show of the week. The following Saturday, the network replaced it with a re-run of Cold Case, a crime drama.

The quick cancellation of The Will was lampooned on an episode of the ABC late night talk show Jimmy Kimmel Live! with a montage of clips from the show, and the message "Will Miss You--January 8, 2005 - January 8, 2005."

Although it was initially reported that the five remaining episodes could appear on an American cable network, they eventually did air on the Fox Reality Channel not long afterwards, and all six episodes aired in New Zealand beginning in December 2005. In the final episode, Long's wife Penny (widely seen as the show's villain) became the overall winner.

Episodes

References

External links
 

2000s American reality television series
2005 American television series debuts
2005 American television series endings
CBS original programming
Television series canceled after one episode